Muğanlı (also, Mughanly) is a village and municipality in the Barda District of Azerbaijan.  It has a population of 621.

References

Populated places in Barda District